James Joseph Parkinson (15 November 1869 – 16 September 1948) was an Irish politician. He was a member of Seanad Éireann from 1922 to 1936 and from 1938 to 1947. A veterinary surgeon, racehorse trainer, bloodstock breeder and company director, he was first elected to the Free State Seanad as a Cumann na nGaedheal member in 1922. From 1938 onwards, he was elected by the Cultural and Educational Panel as a Fine Gael member. He resigned from the Seanad on 31 July 1947 due to poor health.

"J.J." Parkinson was born at Tramore, County Waterford, and qualified as a veterinary surgeon (MRCVS) in London. From 1892 he briefly practised on the Curragh but soon moved into racing. After a short spell in the United States he settled at Maddenstown Lodge also on the Curragh which remained his home for forty-five years. He trained the winners of 2,577 races in Ireland. including two in the Irish Derby before his death after several years of ill-health at Maddenstown Lodge. Parkinson's total of race wins by a trainer was a record in Ireland until beaten by Dermot Weld in 2000, and he was champion trainer in Ireland by number of races won 23 times between 1904 and 1939.

References

1869 births
1948 deaths
Cumann na nGaedheal senators
Fine Gael senators
Members of the 1922 Seanad
Members of the 1925 Seanad
Members of the 1928 Seanad
Members of the 1931 Seanad
Members of the 1934 Seanad
Members of the 2nd Seanad
Members of the 3rd Seanad
Members of the 4th Seanad
Members of the 5th Seanad
Politicians from County Kildare
Irish racehorse trainers
Irish veterinarians
Irish racehorse owners and breeders